Alexandre Corréard (8 October 1788 – 16 February 1857) was a French engineer and geographer. He graduated from the engineering school Arts et Métiers ParisTech.
He is famous for escaping  "The Raft of the Medusa" shipwreck and collaborating with Géricault when he was painting his famous masterpiece.

External links
 
 

1788 births
1857 deaths
French engineers
French geographers